Terra Deflorata was an album by Czesław Niemen released in 1989 and re-released in 1991 on CD as Extended Version.

Track listing 
All lyrics written by Czesław Niemen.

 "Spojrzenie za siebie" – 7:14
 "Klaustrofobia" – 5:36
 "Status mojego ja" – 5:35
 "Zezowata bieda" – 4:44
 "Terra Deflorata" – 6:50
 "Unisono (Na pomieszane języki)" – 1:24
 "Począwszy od Kaina" – 7:06

Extended version (1991 CD reissue) 

 "Pantheon" - 5:35 (new track)
 "Spojrzenie za siebie" - 7:16
 "Klaustrofobia" - 5:34
 "Status mojego ja" - 5:34
 "Alter Ego" - 3:33 (new track)
 "Blue Community" - 7:43 (new track)
 "Zezowata bieda" - 4:45
 "Terra Deflorata" - 6:54
 "Unisono (Na pomieszanie języki)" - 1:27
 "Począwszy od Kaina" - 7:08

Personnel 
Czesław Niemen - vocal, keyboards, moog

References 

Czesław Niemen albums
1989 albums